Annecy station (French: Gare d'Annecy) is a railway station located in Annecy, Haute-Savoie, south-eastern France. The station was opened in 1866 and is located on the Aix-les-Bains–Annemasse railway and the now closed Annecy-Albertville railway. The train services are operated by SNCF. In December 2012 a new multimodal interchange between bus services and the train station was opened.

Train services

As of 2022, the following train services call at Annecy:
High speed services (TGV) Paris - Chambéry - Aix-les-Bains - Annecy
Regional services (TER Auvergne-Rhône-Alpes) Annecy - Aix-les-Bains - Chambéry - Grenoble (- Valence)
Regional services (TER Auvergne-Rhône-Alpes) Annecy - Aix-les-Bains - Ambérieu - Lyon
Local services (TER Auvergne-Rhône-Alpes) Annecy - Saint-Gervais-les-Bains
Local services (Léman Express) Annecy - Annemasse - Geneva - Coppet

See also 

 List of SNCF stations in Auvergne-Rhône-Alpes

References

Railway stations in Haute-Savoie
Railway stations in France opened in 1866